Heterogeneous nuclear ribonucleoprotein L is a protein that in humans is encoded by the HNRNPL gene.

Function 

Heterogeneous nuclear RNAs (hnRNAs) which include mRNA precursors and mature mRNAs are associated with specific proteins to form heterogeneous ribonucleoprotein (hnRNP) complexes. Heterogeneous nuclear ribonucleoprotein L is among the proteins that are stably associated with hnRNP complexes and along with other hnRNP proteins is likely to play a major role in the formation, packaging, processing, and function of mRNA. Heterogeneous nuclear ribonucleoprotein L is present in the nucleoplasm as part of the HNRP complex. HNRP proteins have also been identified outside of the nucleoplasm. Exchange of hnRNP for mRNA-binding proteins accompanies transport of mRNA from the nucleus to the cytoplasm. Since HNRP proteins have been shown to shuttle between the nucleus and the cytoplasm, it is possible that they also have cytoplasmic functions. Two transcript variants encoding different isoforms have been found for this gene.

Interactions
HNRNPL has been shown to interact with:
 HNRNPLL, 
 HNRPK,
 PCBP2,  and
 PTBP1.

References

Further reading